Tryon (meaning: "On-hill town little") is a town in Lincoln County, Oklahoma, United States. The population was 491 at the 2010 census.  The community is named after early land owner Fred S. Tryon.

Geography
Tryon is located at  (35.872494, -96.963078).

Tryon is located on State Highway 105, east of U.S. Route 177.

Demographics

At the 2000 census there were 448 people, 185 households, and 118 families living in the town. The racial makeup of the town was 82.81% White, 13.62% Native American, 1.12% from other races, and 2.46% from two or more races. Hispanic or Latino of any race were 2.01%.

Of the 185 households 29.2% had children under the age of 18 living with them, 48.1% were married couples living together, 9.7% had a female householder with no husband present, and 36.2% were non-families. 33.0% of households were one person and 16.2% were one person aged 65 or older. The average household size was 2.42 and the average family size was 3.08.

The age distribution was 25.4% under the age of 18, 10.7% from 18 to 24, 25.0% from 25 to 44, 24.3% from 45 to 64, and 14.5% 65 or older. The median age was 38 years. For every 100 females, there were 99.1 males. For every 100 females age 18 and over, there were 100.0 males.

The median household income was $21,696 and the median family income  was $27,361. Males had a median income of $28,382 versus $18,125 for females. The per capita income for the town was $10,730. About 12.8% of families and 14.1% of the population were below the poverty line, including 15.4% of those under age 18 and 10.5% of those age 65 or over.

References

Towns in Lincoln County, Oklahoma
Towns in Oklahoma